Aisha Keshy Solórzano García (born 13 April 1998) is a Guatemalan footballer who plays as a forward for the Guatemala women's national team.

References 

1998 births
Living people
Women's association football forwards
Guatemalan women's footballers
Sportspeople from Guatemala City
Guatemala women's international footballers
Southeastern Fire women's soccer players
Guatemalan expatriate footballers
Guatemalan expatriate sportspeople in the United States
Expatriate women's soccer players in the United States